Baron Melchett, of Landford in the County of Southampton, was a title in the Peerage of the United Kingdom. It was created on 5 June 1928 for Sir Alfred Mond, 1st Baronet, Chairman of Imperial Chemical Industries and a former First Commissioner of Works and Minister of Health. He had already been created a Baronet, of Hartford Hill in Great Budworth in the County of Chester, on 8 July 1910.

Mond was succeeded by his only son, the second Baron. He was also a politician and businessman. His second but only surviving son, the third Baron, was a businessman. The latter's son, the fourth Baron, succeeded in 1973. He held political office under James Callaghan in the late 1970s and was later Executive Director of Greenpeace UK.

Ludwig Mond, father of the first Baron, was an industrialist.

Barons Melchett (1928)
Alfred Moritz Mond, 1st Baron Melchett (1868–1930)
Henry Ludwig Mond, 2nd Baron Melchett (1898–1949)
Julian Edward Alfred Mond, 3rd Baron Melchett (1925–1973)
Peter Robert Henry Mond, 4th Baron Melchett (1948–2018)

The barony and baronetcy became extinct on the death of the 4th Baron in 2018 because his only son was illegitimate, and under peerage law could not succeed to his father's titles.  According to Desert Island Discs broadcast on BBC Radio on 4 February 2000, Lord Melchett intentionally had his son out of wedlock because he was against the inheritance of privilege.

Coat of arms

References

Kidd, Charles, Williamson, David (editors). Debrett's Peerage and Baronetage (1990 edition). New York: St Martin's Press, 1990 

1928 establishments in the United Kingdom
2018 disestablishments in the United Kingdom
Extinct baronies in the Peerage of the United Kingdom
Noble titles created in 1928
Noble titles created for UK MPs